The fatti di Rovereta (the Rovereta affair) was a constitutional crisis in San Marino in 1957 in which the Grand and General Council was deliberately rendered inquorate to prevent the scheduled election of Captains-Regent. A provisional government was established in the village of Rovereta, in opposition to the outgoing Captains-Regent whose term had expired.

Background
Following the end of the fascist government and World War II, the 1945 general elections produced a Communist-Socialist coalition government, making it the only communist republic west of the Iron Curtain. Both the middle and working class supported the socialists and communists out of fear that San Marino would return to being ruled by an oligarchy of local patrician families. However, due to it being majority communist, America boycotted the economy of San Marino and did not give it funds from the Marshall Plan for reconstruction. The American government also put pressure on the Italian government to not respect any agreements made with the country. This made San Marino extremely poor but it still continued to vote communist. The government brought several welcomed reforms and only nationalized three drugstores.

In the 1955 general elections, the ruling coalition won 35 of the 60 seats in the Grand and General Council. Five moderate Socialist members of the council wanted to break the alliance with the Communists who were close to the Soviet Union and did not condemn Soviet actions during the Hungarian Revolution of 1956.  They left in April 1957 to form a new party, the Sammarinese Independent Democratic Socialist Party (PSDIS).  This left a perfect 30–30 split in the council that paralyzed the government. Given the deadlock, the Captains-Regent avoided convening the council until the mandatory 19 September regency election to choose their replacements.

Crisis
A day before the election, one Communist councillor became an independent and joined the opposition, giving them the majority. However it was the practice of the Socialist and Communist parties to enforce party discipline by making their councillors sign letters of resignation after each election, with the date left blank. The party chiefs submitted to the regency all 35 letters, including the six who left their parties, with the date of 19 September. With the majority of seats vacant in the council, there was no quorum, so the regency dissolved the council until new general elections could be held on 3 November which the communist was likely to win. But because the council did not elect a new regency, the status of the sitting regency would be uncertain once their terms expired on 1 October, causing a constitutional crisis. The regency ordered the Gendarmerie to seal off the Palazzo Pubblico, preventing any councillors from entering. The opposition was in an uproar as the six defectors claimed their resignations were invalid and what transpired was a coup. Federico Bigi, leader of the Sammarinese Christian Democratic Party, led his men into a church and declared the communist government illegal, forming an executive consul. The communists claimed they would arrest the ex-consul members and so they went underground.

On 28 September, the Italian carabinieri and soldiers set up roadblocks on highways leading into San Marino and refused passage to anyone besides journalists and foreign tourists. This was to insure that communists from Romagna and the Marches could not join the militia. According to Vice, The Italian government didn't wish to get involved in what it saw as an American fixation but was pressured to do so in order to not upset its allies. However others sources say the opposition government was recognized immediately by Italy. Eventually, no one was allowed in or out including food shipments and medicines.

On the night of 30 September, near midnight, the opposition council and a few supporters occupied an abandoned factory in the town of Rovereta, Serravalle on the Italian border. At the stroke of midnight when the regency should have expired, the councillors declared the provisional government of San Marino. It was immediately recognized by France, the United States, and Italy (or one day later according to Vice).

Soon after, both the communist and provisional governments began to organize militias as the police force declared neutrality. Italy also sent in a force of 150 carabinieri to support the provisional government. Initially the communists only had 150 men armed with German machine guns left over from WWII to 1891 muskets. The provisional government had a smaller 100-man force but was armed with more modern weapons. The communists sent a letter to the United Nations asking for them to send a peacekeeping force but they were denied. By 2 October, both forces had grown by about 100 men and a communist militant shot at an anti-communist militant but missed. No other shots were fired as neither side wanted to shed blood.

Resolution
Italy recognized the provisional government and Italian Carabinieri protected the three sides of the factory that sat in their territory.  The regency organized a militia of supporters and weapons flowed in from Italy to both sides.  On 11 October, the regency caved in and recognized the provisional government, ending the crisis. The new government elected a new regency.  One of its acts was to provide for women's suffrage.  General elections were held in 1959, confirming the victory of the PSDIS-Christian Democrat coalition.

References

Bibliography 
Maria Antonietta Bonelli a cura di Valentina Rossi, 1957 Rovereta, Minerva Edizioni in collaborazione con la Fondazione San Marino, Bologna, 2011, 
Claudio Visani, Gli intrighi di una Repubblica. San Marino e Romagna, 80 anni di storia raccontati dai protagonisti. Prefazione di Sergio Zavoli. Bologna, Pendragon Edizioni, 2012

External links

 1957: The Rovereta Affair
 Footage about Fatti di Rovereta 
LIFE Magazine Nov. 4, 1957

History of San Marino
1957 in San Marino
1957 in politics
Constitutional crises
Conflicts in 1957